Glen Air (born 17 November 1975 in Bulli, New South Wales) is an Australian former rugby league footballer who played in the 1990s and 2000s.

He attended Bulli High School in New South Wales and from there represented Australia at schoolboy level in 1991. Air went on to play for the Illawarra Steelers and the Wests Tigers in Australia. In the Super League he played for the London Broncos.

References

External links
London Broncos profile
NRL points
Wakefield coach in 'cheat' jibe

1975 births
Living people
Australian rugby league players
Australian expatriate sportspeople in England
Illawarra Steelers players
London Broncos players
Rugby league five-eighths
Rugby league halfbacks
Rugby league hookers
Rugby league players from Wollongong
Wests Tigers players